The Prestwich Medal is a medal of the Geological Society of London established in the will of Joseph Prestwich "to apply the accumulated annual proceeds...at the end of every three years, in providing a Gold Medal to the value of Twenty Pounds which, with the remainder of the proceeds is to be awarded... to the person or persons either male or female, and either resident in England or abroad, who shall have done well for the advancement of the Science of Geology; or, from time to time to accumulate the annual proceeds for a period not exceeding six years, and apply the said accumulated annual proceeds to some object of special research bearing on Stratigraphical or Physical Geology, to be carried out by one single individual or by a Committee; or, failing these objects, to accumulate the annual proceeds for either three or six years and devote such proceeds to such special purposes as may be decided".  The money has also been used for funding publication and a library extension.

Prestwich medalists 
Source: Geological Society

See also

 List of geology awards
 Prizes named after people

References

Geology awards
Awards of the Geological Society of London
British science and technology awards
Awards established in 1903
1903 establishments in the United Kingdom